The San Luis National Wildlife Refuge in the San Joaquin Valley of central California is one of the great remnants of a historically bountiful wintering grounds for migratory waterfowl on the Pacific Flyway. Located in the Bear Creek, Salt Slough, and San Joaquin River floodplain, it hosts a myriad of tree-lined channels and oxbows, wetlands and native grasslands.

Thousands of acres of wetlands, fed by an intricate set of canals, are managed to produce natural food supplies for migratory waterfowl. San Luis also contains the most extensive network of pristine native grasslands, shrubs, and vernal pools that still remain within the Central Valley.

Thousands upon thousands of mallard, pintail, green-winged teal, and ring-necked ducks flock into the managed wetlands; while the  wood duck lives throughout the tree-lined slough channels.

Herons and egrets nest in mature oaks and willows and feed on the refuge's abundant frog and crayfish populations. A wide diversity of songbirds, hawks, and owls also use refuge habitat.

Hunting is allowed in the winter season on a portion of the refuge, which also holds a herd of reintroduced endangered tule elk, the smallest subspecies of all American elks.

Photos

See also
Kesterson National Wildlife Refuge, a former refuge now closed due to pollution
Kesterson Reservoir, now located within San Luis National Wildlife Refuge

References

San Luis National Wildlife Refuge profile

External links

Official San Luis National Wildlife Refuge website

National Wildlife Refuges in California
Parks in the San Joaquin Valley
San Joaquin River
Wetlands of California
Protected areas of Merced County, California
Natural history of the Central Valley (California)
Geography of Merced County, California
Protected areas established in 1966
1966 establishments in California